The Town of Buena Vista (BEW-na Vista) is a Statutory Town located in Chaffee County, Colorado, United States. The town population was 2,855 at the 2020 United States Census.

History
The Arkansas River Valley and the area of what would become Buena Vista was first settled in 1864 by settlers drawn to the area by the plentiful water which made the land suitable for agriculture. By 1880, the county seat had moved from Granite to Buena Vista, but by 1928 Salida had a larger population so the county seat was moved once again. By 1894, Buena Vista had electricity, telephone service, street lights, parks, cemeteries, and schools. Travelers, speculators, and miners traveling up the Arkansas Valley towards Leadville made Buena Vista a popular stagecoach stop, and railroad depot following the 1890s. While certainly experiencing economic ups and downs, the valley's agricultural economy has made the area more resistant to the 'boom, bust' cycle of mining towns.

The area between Buena Vista and Salida is often referred to as the Denver & Rio Grande, South Park & Pacific, and Colorado Midland railroads. Many of the existing buildings of Buena Vista date back to this era, and were built in the 1880s and 1890s.

The name "Buena Vista", Spanish for "Good View", can often be heard pronounced locally as "Byoo-na Vista". This Americanized pronunciation was specified by Alsina Dearheimer, who chose this name for the town, which was officially selected over other names (Cottonwood, Mahonville) on the occasion of the town's incorporation. Alternate pronunciations include "Bwenna Veesta" (Spanish pronunciation) and simply "Biewnie." Many residents simply refer to the town as "BV".

Trustees recall election
Then-Mayor Cara Russell wrote a column for the Chaffee County Times entitled "How big a payoff do you want?", about the pros and cons of a local land development, on October 29, 2008. Several town trustees believed the vote to annex the Cottonwood Meadows development was lost by a mere 21 votes because of the mayor's letter giving both the advantages and disadvantages of the real estate development.

The column prompted five of the six town trustees to present her with a letter of dismissal on November 10, 2008. Russell requested a hearing over her dismissal. Two weeks later, after the trustees determined that this was not the best course of action, having been informed by the mayor's attorney that they could be in violation of the mayor's First Amendment rights and subject to criminal charges, they voted to withdraw the letter of dismissal.

Russell was re-elected April 6, 2010, and resigned on April 20, 2010, to run for Chaffee County Clerk. On April 16, 2010, Russell filed a federal lawsuit against the town of Buena Vista and five town trustees for violation of her First Amendment rights.

On July 9, 2010, The Mountain Mail newspaper reported that the trustees denied the allegations and contended that they were, under legal doctrines, immune from the lawsuit. They also contended Russell's public statements opposing the annexation were not protected by the First Amendment. Russell and the town of Buena Vista settled the lawsuit with the town paying an undisclosed amount and issuing an apology for violating her First Amendment rights.

Geography
Buena Vista is located in the Upper Arkansas River Valley at  (38.829332 -106.139515).

Climate
Buena Vista has a Semi-arid climate (Köppen climate classification BSk), with cold, dry winters and warm, somewhat wetter summers. Altitude and dryness cause the diurnal temperature variation to be high year-round.

Demographics

As of the census of 2000, there were 2,195 people, 978 households, and 622 families residing in the town. The racial makeup of the town was 96.81% Caucasian, 0.09% African American, 0.64% Native American, 0.27% Asian, 0.73% from other races, and 1.46% from two or more races. Hispanic or Latino of any race were 4.74% of the population.

There were 978 households, out of which 27.1% had children under the age of 18 living with them, 54.2% were married couples living together, 7.7% had a female householder with no husband present, and 36.3% were non-families. 31.0% of all households were made up of individuals, and 12.8% had someone living alone who was 65 years of age or older. The average household size was 2.24 and the average family size was 2.83.

In the town, the population was spread out, with 23.6% under the age of 18, 5.1% from 18 to 24, 26.7% from 25 to 44, 27.8% from 45 to 64, and 16.7% who were 65 years of age or older. The median age was 42 years. For every 100 females, there were 92.4 males. For every 100 females age 18 and over, there were 85.8 males.

The median income for a household in the town was $34,800, and the median income for a family was $40,455. Males had a median income of $32,841 versus $25,486 for females. The per capita income for the town was $16,920. About 9.4% of families and 11.7% of the population were below the poverty line, including 19.1% of those under age 18 and 5.7% of those age 65 or over.

Transportation
U.S. Route 24 is an east–west highway running from Clarkston, Michigan, to its intersection with Interstate 70 near Minturn, Colorado.

The short segment between US 50 at Poncha Springs and US 24 at Buena Vista was originally U.S. Route 650, designated in 1926. US 285 was commissioned in 1936 along its present extent from Sanderson, Texas, to Denver, mostly replacing state-numbered highways.

Chaffee County Road 306 leaves Buena Vista and travels west to the summit of Cottonwood Pass (elevation . This road is closed during the snowy months, typically late October to April or May, but when open allows travelers a more direct route to Gunnison and Crested Butte than US 50 crossing Monarch Pass to the south of town.

Buena Vista is part of Colorado's Bustang network. It is on the Gunnison-Denver Outrider line.

Notable people 
 Christine Arguello (born 1955), federal judge
 Trace Bundy, acoustic guitar player
 Austin Carlile, vocalist, Of Mice and Men
 Mason Finley, American shot putter and discus thrower
 Matt Hemingway, American track and field athlete
 Curtis Imrie, pack burro racer
 Nate Solder, tackle, New York Giants

See also

Colorado
Bibliography of Colorado
Index of Colorado-related articles
Outline of Colorado
List of counties in Colorado
List of municipalities in Colorado
List of places in Colorado
 Arkansas River
 Cottonwood Pass
 Mount Princeton

References

External links

 Town of Buena Vista official website
 CDOT map of the Town of Buena Vista
 Buena Vista Chamber of Commerce
 Chaffee County Times (local newspaper)

Towns in Chaffee County, Colorado
Towns in Colorado
Colorado populated places on the Arkansas River
Former county seats in Colorado